Sri Ranganathaswamy Temple is a Hindu temple dedicated to Ranganatha (a form of Vishnu), located in Srirangam, Tiruchirapalli, Tamil Nadu, India. Constructed in the Hindu architectural style, the temple is glorified by Alvars in their Naalayira Divya Prabhandam and has the unique distinction of being the foremost among the 108 Divya Desams dedicated to the god Vishnu.

It is the most illustrious Vaishnava temples in South India rich in legend and history. The temple has played an important role in Vaishnavism history starting with the 11th-century career of Ramanuja and his predecessors Nathamuni and Yamunacharya in Srirangam. Its location, on an island between the Kollidam and Kaveri rivers, has rendered it vulnerable to flooding as well as the rampaging of invading armies which repeatedly commandeered the site for military encampment. The temple was looted and destroyed by the Delhi Sultanate armies in a broad plunder raid on various cities of the Pandyan kingdom in early 14th century. The temple was rebuilt in late 14th century, the site fortified and expanded with many more gopurams in the 16th and 17th centuries. It was one of the hubs of early Bhakti movement with a devotional singing and dance tradition, but this tradition stopped during the 14th century and was revived in a limited way much later.

The temple town is a significant archaeological and epigraphical site, providing a historic window into the early and mid medieval South Indian society and culture. Numerous inscriptions suggest that this Hindu temple served not only as a spiritual center, but also a major economic and charitable institution that operated education and hospital facilities, ran a free kitchen, and financed regional infrastructure projects from the gifts and donations it received.

The Srirangam temple is the largest temple compound in India and one of the largest religious complexes in the world. Some of these structures have been renovated, expanded and rebuilt over the centuries as a living temple. Srirangam temple is often listed as one of the largest functioning Hindu temple in the world, the still larger Angkor Wat being the largest existing temple. The temple is an active Hindu house of worship and follows the Tenkalai tradition of Sri Vaishnavism. The annual 21-day festival conducted during the Tamil month of Margali (December–January) attracts 1 million visitors. The temple complex has been nominated as a UNESCO World Heritage Site, and is in UNESCO's tentative list.

Location 
The city is connected daily to other major cities by the network of Indian Railways, Tamil Nadu bus services and the Highway 38. The site is near the Tiruchirappalli International Airport (IATA: TRZ).

The temple site is on a large island bounded by the Kaveri River and Kollidam River. It is vast and planned as a temple town with Sapta-Prakaram design where the sanctum, gopuram, services and living area are co-located in seven concentric enclosures. Rampart walls were added after medieval centuries that saw its invasion and destruction. The temple monuments are located inside the inner five enclosures of the complex, surrounded by living area and infrastructure in outer two enclosures. Numerous gopurams connect the Sapta-Prakaram enclosures allowing the pilgrims and visitors to reach the sanctum from many directions. The site includes two major temples, one for Vishnu as Ranganatha, and other to Shiva as Jambukeshvara. The island has some cave temples, older than both.

History 
A temple at Srirangam is mentioned in Tamil literature of the Sangam era (6th century BCE to the 4th century CE), including the epic Silapadikaram (book 11, lines 35–40):

 
The temple was first built by the Chola ruler, Dharmavarma. The Kaveri river flood destroyed the temple vimanam, and later, the early Cholas King Killivalavan rebuilt the temple complex as is present today. Beyond the ancient textual history, archaeological evidence such as inscriptions refer to this temple, but these stone inscriptions are from late 1st millennium CE. The inscriptions in the temple belong to the Chola, Pandya, Hoysala and Vijayanagara dynasties who ruled over the region. These inscriptions range in date between the 9th and 16th centuries.

During the period of invasion and plunder by the Alauddin Khilji's Muslim general Malik Kafur and his Delhi Sultanate forces in 1311, the Arabic texts of the period state that he raided a "golden temple" on river "Kanobari" (Kaveri), destroyed the temple and took the plunder with the golden icon of the deity to Delhi. According to Steven P. Hopkins, this is believed to be the Ranganathaswamy Temple.

The Tamil texts that followed offer various inconsistent legends on how the temple regained the Vishnu icon. According to one found in Koil Oluku, a young girl had vowed to fast till she had seen the icon.  She followed the Muslim army as it returned with the loot back to Delhi. There she sneaked into the palace and saw that the Sultan's daughter had fallen in love with the image. The young girl returned to Srirangam and told the priests about what she had seen in Delhi. The priests went with musicians to Delhi, found the icon in capriciously playful possession of the Sultan's daughter, day and night.  They sang and danced before the Sultan to return the icon, and he gave it back which upset his daughter. To console the daughter, the Sultan sent in his army again to bring it back, but this time they were not successful. According to other versions, the Muslim daughter followed the icon from Delhi to Srirangam on a horse and still not seeing the idol, gave up her life before the door of the sanctum, symbolizing that love brought back the icon after the war had taken it away.

Beyond these legends, there was a more severe second invasion of South India including Srirangam between 1323 CE and 1327 CE by the armies of the Sultanate under Muhammad bin Tughluq. The sanctum's Vishnu image with its jewelry was pre-emptively removed by the Hindus before the Delhi Sultanate troops reached Srirangam by a group led by the Vaishnavite Acharaya Pillai Lokacharyar to Tirunelveli in Tamil Nadu. The Goddess Ranganayaki (Lakshmi) was also taken away to another location by a separate group. The temple was defended and according to the Tamil tradition some 13,000 Sri Vaishnavas devotees of Srirangam, died in the fierce battle.

After nearly six decades when Madurai Sultanate ruled after the Pandyan rulers were ousted after the repeated Delhi Sultanate's invasions, the Vijayanagara Empire ousted the Madurai Sultanate in 1378. Thereafter, the  image of Namberumal was brought back to Srirangam. Before then, for decades the deity and the priestly wardens wandered and secretly carried the temple's icon through villages of Tamil Nadu, Kerala and Karnataka. They finally went to the hills of Tirumala Tirupati, where they remained until the temple was rebuilt in 1371. The icon was consecrated again according to the legends. This time, in memory of the first Sultan's daughter which tradition calls Thulukha Nachiyar, a niche in the temple was built for her. The niche shows her as a girl sitting on a horse that carried her to Delhi. Her legend is still remembered.

Thereafter, under the Vijayanagara Empire, the temple site saw over 200 years of stability, repairs, first round of fortifications, and addition of mandapas. The Vishnu and Lakshmi images were reinstalled and the site became a Hindu temple again in 1371 CE under Kumara Kampana, a Vijayanagara commander and the son of Bukka I. In the last decade of the 14th century, a pillared antechamber was gifted by the Vijayanagara rulers. In the 15th century, they coated the apsidal roofs with solid gold sheets, followed by financing the addition of a series of new shrines, mandapas and gopuras to the temple, according to George Michell.

After the destruction of the Vijayanagara in late 16th century, geo-political instability returned. The site became the focus of bitter wars between the Hindu Nayakas and the Muslim Mughals in the 17th century. The Nayakas fortified the temple town and the seven prakaras. It was taken over by Muslim Nawabs of Arcot as a lucrative source of revenues, and thereafter attracted a contest between the French and British military powers. Srirangam temple site and the neighboring city of Tiruchirappalli (Trichy) became an intense center of Christian and Muslim missionary activity during the 18th and 19th centuries. With the establishment of the Madras Presidency within the British Empire, geo-political stability returned and the Ranganathaswamy Temple site attracted interest in archeological and historical studies.

Sri Vaishnavism
The epigraphical evidence suggests that these Hindu dynasties — Cholas, Pandyas, Hoysalas, Gajapatis, Nayaks, Vijayanagara – assisted with rebuilding, renovation and supported the traditional customs. Some mention substantial gifts to the temple. A Chola king, for example, presented the temple with a golden serpent couch. Some historians identify this king with Rajamahendra Chola. The temple has witnessed and played a key role in the early Sri Vaishnavism history, particularly the centuries that followed the major Hindu philosopher Ramanuja (1017–1137 CE), and his predecessors Nathamuni and Yamunacharya. It witnessed the debate between the Dvaita (dualistic) and Advaita (non-dualistic) sub-traditions within Vaishnavism. Centuries later, it was a key site in the debate and disagreements between the northern Tamil and southern Tamil traditions, also called as the Vadakalai and Tenkalai. The early rulers such as the Pallavas, Cholas and Pandyas supported it as a hub of the Bhakti movement with a devotional singing and dance tradition, but this tradition stopped during the 14th century and was revived in a limited way much later.

Puranic Story 

The temple and its artwork are a subject of numerous different Tamil legends covered in regional Puranic texts. Sriranga Mahathmiyam, for example, is one of the compilation of the temple mythology about its origins. According to it, Brahma was performing austerities during the Samudra Manthana (churning of cosmic ocean), and Srirangam Vimanam emerged as a result. It remained in Satyaloka for ages, was brought to Ayodhya by king Ikshvaku. After Rama, an avatar of Vishnu, had killed the evil demon Ravana, he gave it to King Vibhishana who wanted to be with Rama. When Vibhishana passed through Tiruchi en route to Sri Lanka where he had become the king, the Srirangam Vimanam would not move from the island. So, he gave it to a local king called Dharmavarma, if the king consecrated the Vimanam to face the south cardinal direction eternally, blessing him and Lanka. Hence, it is that the deity (in a reclining posture) faces South, his body aligned to the east-west axis.

As per another legend, Sanaka, the four child sages, came for a darshana of Ranganatha in Srirangam. They were stopped by Jaya and Vijaya, the guardians of Vaikuntha. In spite of their pleadings, they were refused entry. In anger, all four of them cursed the guardians in one voice and left. The guardians approached Vishnu and told him about the curse. Ranganatha said that he would not be able to revert the curse and gave them two options: be born as demons opposing Vishnu in three births or good human beings in the following seven births. Eager to be back with the Lord, The guardians accepted being demons and are believed to have taken the form of Hiranyaksha and Hiranyakasipu; Ravana and Kumbhakarna; and Sisupala and Dantavakra. Vishnu assumed four avatars – Varaha, Narasimha, Rama, and Krishna, respectively – to kill the demons in each one of those births.

Architecture 

The temple is enclosed by 7 concentric enclosures with courtyards (termed prakarams or mathil suvar). Each layer has walls and gopurams, which were built or fortified in and after the 16th century. These walls total  or over six miles. The temple has 17 major gopurams (towers, 21 total), 39 pavilions, 50 shrines, 9 sacred water pools, Ayiram kaal mandapam (a hall of 1000 pillars) and several small water bodies inside.

The temple is aligned to the north-south and east-west axis, on an island surrounded by the Kaveri River. The river has long been considered sacred, and called the Daksina Ganga or the "Ganges of the South". The outer two prakarams (outer courtyard) are residential and markets with shops, restaurants and flower stalls. The five inner courtyards have shrines to Vishnu and his various avatars such as Rama and Krishna. Major shrines are additionally dedicated to goddess Lakshmi and many saints of Vaishnavism. In particular, these shrines celebrate and commemorate the Tamil poet-saints and philosophers called the Alvars, as well Hindu philosophers such as Ramanuja and Manavala Mamunigal of Sri Vaishnavism tradition.

Despite the construction of various mandapas and gopuras over a span of many centuries, the architecture of the Ranganathaswamy temple is one of the better illustrations of Hindu temple planometric geometry per agama design texts in the Tamil tradition. According to George Michell, a professor and art historian on Indian architecture, the regulating geometry and plan of Srirangam site takes on "a ritual dimension since all the architectural components, especially the focal gopuras and the most important colonnades and mandapas, are arranged along the axes dictated by the cardinal directions". This alignment integrates the routes that devotees follow as they journey into the innermost sanctum.

Shrines 

The temple complex includes over 50 shrines. These are dedicated to Vishnu, Lakshmi as well as various Vaishnava scholars and poets. The shrines to Vishnu display him in his various avatars, as well as his iconography. For example, Sri Ranganathaswamy temple shrines include those of Chakkaratalvar, Narasimha, Rama, Hayagriva, and Gopala Krishna.

The Chakratalvar shrine is in the east facing on the south side of Akalanka. The sanctum is approached through a Mukamandapa (six rows of pillars) built during the Cholas and a Mahamandapa with six rows of eight pillars built during the period of Vijayanagar Empire. There is a circumambulation passage around the sanctum. The image of Chakratalvar is sculpted with Narasimha on the rear side and can be viewed from the passage around the sanctum. The Venugopala shrine, one of the most elaborately carved, is in the south-west corner of the fourth enclosure of the temple was rebuilt by Chokkanatha Nayak, according to an inscription dated 1674.

The main shrine for Ranganatha is in the innermost courtyard. The sanctum has a golden vimanam (crown tower over the sanctum sanctorum). It is shaped like the Tamil omkara (om symbol), shows anthropomorphic Paravasudeva on its gable, has an etching of Ramanuja as well on it, and is plated with gold. Inside, a  edifice of Sri Ranganthar reclining on Adisesha, the coiled serpent, can be seen. Adisesha has five hoods and is coiled into three and a half rounds. Vishnu's head rests on a small cylindrical pillow and his right palm which faces upwards rests next to his head. Neither Sridevi (goddess Lakshmi) nor Bhudevi (goddess Earth) are depicted near his feet, as is found in late medieval era paintings. The sanctum does not show Brahma coming out of or connected to his navel either. However, the procession images of Sridevi, Bhudevi and Ranganathar, otherwise known as Alagiyamanavalan and Namperumal reside within the sanctum in different places to ease their darshana (viewing).

The sanctum can be entered through the south gateway, one the reclining Vishnu is facing. The doorway as one enters from the mukhamandapam, also called the Gayatri mantapa, is flanked by Jaya and Vijaya, the guardians of Vaikuntha. The sanctum chamber is round, even though the vimana above is an oval projection. The circumambulation path (pradakshina-patha) is set in a square, to journey clockwise. This garbha-griha is surrounded by a raised square Tiruvunnali, encircling pillars and another inner square. As the visitor completes the circumambulation around the resting Vishnu, one sees four additional images. On the western wall inside the core sanctum is Ganesha (son of Shiva and Parvati, Shaivism), on the northwestern corner is Yoga-Ananta (Vishnu seated in yoga asana on Sesha, Vaishnavism), on the northeastern side is Yoga-Narasimha (Narasimha seated in yoga asana, Vaishnavism), and on the eastern wall is Durga (an aspect of Parvati, Shaktism), considered to be Vishnu's sister.

The exterior of the vimana and attached mandapam (hall) have intricately carved pilasters with fluted shafts, double capitals, and pendant lotus brackets. Sculptures are placed in the niches of three sides of the sanctuary walls; maidens enhance the walls in between. The elevation is punctuated with a secondary set of pilasters that support shallow eaves at different levels to cap larger and smaller recesses. The sanctuary is crowned in the traditional fashion with a hemispherical roof. The double-curved eaves of the entrance porch on the east side are concealed in a later columned hall.  Dhanvantari, a great physician of the Hindu mythos is considered to be an avatar of Vishnu – there is a separate shrine of Dhanvantari within the temple.

The shrine of Ranganatha's consort, Ranganayaki (Lakshmi) is in the second precinct of the temple with 2 main idols (moola mortis) and 1 procession idol (utsava murti). During the festival processions, Ranganayaki does not visit Ranganatha, but it is he who visits her. Ranganatha visiting Ranganayaki and being with her is called as 'Saerthi' during 'Panguni Uthiram'.  There are three images of Ranganayaki within the sanctum.

There are separate shrines for major saints in the Vaishnava tradition, including Ramanuja.

Mandapams (Halls) 

The Ranganathaswamy Temple has many mandapams:
Thousand pillar mandapam is a theatre like structure made from granite. It was built during the Vijayanagara rule period. It has a central wide aisle with seven side aisles on each side with pillars set in a square pattern.
Sesharaya mandapam is the intricately carved hall built during the Nayaka rule period. It is found on the east side of the fourth prakaram courtyard. The northern side of this community hall has 40 leaping animals with riders on their back, all carved out of monolithic pillars. 
Garuda Mandapam is named after the vahana (vehicle) of Vishnu, named Garuda. It is on the south side of the third prakaram courtyard. It too is dated to the Nayak rule era. Inside the community hall, on its pillars, are portrait sculptures. In the middle is a free-standing seated Garuda figure, identifiable by his eagle-head, wings and him facing the Vishnu shrine.
Kili mandapam is found inside the innermost (first) prakaram courtyard. It is next to the Ranganatha sanctum. Here walking elephant balustrades line the steps that lead into the gathering hall. This is dated to the 17th century Hindu rulers. The hall and structural elements are carved with animals, and in its center is a raised square platform with four carved pillars.
Ranga Vilasa mandapam is one of the larger community halls designed for large spaces between the pillars for the pilgrim groups and families to sit together and rest. It is covered with Hindu mythology murals and narratives from the Ramayana.

The Hall of 1000 pillars is a fine example of a planned theatre-like structure and opposite to it is the "Sesha Mandap". The 1000-pillared hall made of granite was constructed in the Vijayanagara period (1336–1565) on the site of the old temple. The most artistic halls that the Nayaks added to the complex is the Sesha Mandap on the east side of the fourth enclosure. The hall is celebrated for the leaping animals carved on to the piers at its northern end. The pillars consists of sculptures of wildly rearing horses bearing riders on their backs and trampling with their hoofs upon the heads of rampant tigers, seem only natural and congruous among such weird surroundings. The great hall is traversed by one wide aisle in the centre for the whole of its greater length, and intersected by transepts of like dimension running across at right angles. There still remain seven side aisles on each side, in which all the pillars are equally spaced out.
The Garuda Mandapa (hall of the legendary bird deity of Vishnu, garuda) located on the south side of the third enclosure is another Nayak addition. Courtly portrait sculptures, reused from an earlier structure, are fixed to the piers lining the central aisle. A free-standing shrine inside the hall contains a large seated figure of Garuda; the eagle-headed god faces north towards the principal sanctum.
The Kili mandapa (Hall of parrot) is located next to the Ranganatha shrine, in the first enclosure of the temple. Elephant balustrades skirt the access steps that ascend to a spacious open area. This is bounded by decorated piers with rearing animals and attached colonettes in the finest 17th-century manner. Four columns in the middle define a raised dais; their shafts are embellished with undulating stalks.

Gopurams 

There are 21 gopurams (tower gateways), among which the towering Rajagopuram (shrine of the main gateway) is the tallest temple tower in Asia. The 13-tiered  Rajagopuram  was built in 1987 by Ahobhila Matha, a historic Srivaishnava Hindu monastery. This tower dominates the landscape for miles around, while the remaining 20 gopurams were built between the 12th and early 17th centuries. The gopurams have pronounced projections in the middle of the long sides, generally with openings on each of the successive levels. The Vellai gopura (white tower) on the east side of the fourth enclosure has a steep pyramidal superstructure that reaches a height of almost . The structure of the Rajagopuram remained incomplete for over 400 years. Started during the reign of Achyuta Deva Raya of Vijayanagara Empire, the construction stopped after the fall of Vijayanagara in late 16th century and wars thereafter. The Rajagopuram (the main gopuram) did not reach its current height of  until 1987, when the 44th Jiyar (acharya, chief counsellor) of Ahobila Matha began collecting donations to complete it. The whole structure was constructed in a span of eight years. The Rajagopuram  was consecrated on 25 March 1987.

Inscriptions and frescoes 
The Ranganathaswamy Temple town has over 800 inscriptions, of which nearly 640 are on temple walls and monuments. Many of these relate to gifts and grants by rulers or the elite, while others relate to the temple's management, scholars, dedication and general operation. The inscriptions have been a source of information about South Indian history, culture, economy and social role. These range from the late 9th century to the rule of Aditya Chola I, to the last historical ones from the 16th century. Others are from the times of Cholas, Nayakas, Pandyas, Hoysalas and the Vijayanagara era.

The historic inscriptions at the Ranganathaswamy Temple are in six major Indian languages: Tamil, Sanskrit, Kannada, Telugu, Marathi and Odia. Many of the inscriptions are in Grantha characters. 

The temple has a lot of inscriptions of Kulottunga I. One interesting epigraph is a Kannada record that states that an entourage led by the Kannada-sandhivigrahi (foreign affairs minister) of Chalukya Tribhuvanamalla (Vikramaditya VI) made some donations to the temple. The inscription is dated in the 29th year of the reign of Kulottunga I.

The temple has inscriptions of the Suryavamshi Gajapatis of Odisha as well. In one inscription, it is mentioned that Hamvira Deva Mahapatra, son of the legendary Kapilendra Deva Gajapati, made donations to the temple after he aggressively marched upon the Vijayanagara Empire upto Tiruchirapally and then Rameswaram. This inscription is in Tamil.

Some of the mandapam and corridors of the Temple complex have frescoes, of which some have faded. These narrate Hindu legends and mythologies, or scenes relating to Vaishnava scholars.

Granaries, tanks, and other monuments 
The Ranganathaswamy Temple complex includes huge medieval era Kottarams or granaries. These provided food reserves and security to the temple town and supplies to its kitchen serving the needy travelers, pilgrims and local population. The temple has many other structures, participating and supporting various aspects of social life. Some mandapams and temple compounds were devoted to education, both religious and secular such as of musicians and dancers. The temple inscriptions state that its premises had an arokyashala (hospital) for those needing medical care. Several 11th and 12th century inscriptions describe a gift of land to support recitation of Hindu texts in the temple and for feeding Sri Vaishnavas.

The temple has twelve major water tanks. Of these, the Surya Pushkarini (sun pool) and Chandra Pushkarani (moon pool) are two of the largest that harvest most of rainwater. They have a combined capacity of two million liters of water.

The temple has wooden monuments that is regularly maintained and used for festive processions. These have intricate carvings of Hindu legends, and some are plated with silver or gold foils. The most significant of the temple chariots are the Garuda vahana, the Simha vahana, the Yanai vahana, the Kudirai vahana, the Hanumantha vahana, the Yazhi vahana, the Sesha vahana, the Annapakshi vahana, the Otrai vahana and the Prabhai vahana.

Significance

Bhakti movement
Ranganathaswamy temple is the only one out of the 108 temples that was sung in praise by all the Alvars (Poet-saints of the Bhakti movement), having a total of 247 pasurams (divine hymns) against its name. Acharyas (guru) of all schools of thought – Advaita, Vishistadvaita and Dvaita recognise the immense significance of the temple, regardless of their affiliations.

Naalayira Divya Prabhandam is a collection of 4000 hymns sung by twelve alvars saints spread over 300 years (from the late 6th to 9th century CE) and collected by Nathamuni (910–990 CE). Divya Desams refer to 108 Vishnu temples that are mentioned in Naalayira Divya Prabandham. 105 of these are located in India, 1 in Nepal, while 2 are located outside of the Earthly realms. Divya in Tamil language indicates premium and Desam indicates place or temple. Periyalvar begins the decad on Srirangam with two puranic stories according to which Krishna restored to life the son of his guru Sandeepani and the children of a brahmin. Thondaradippodi Alvar and Thiruppana Alvar have sung exclusively on Ranganatha. Andal attained Sri Ranganatha on completion of her Thiruppavai (a composition of 30 verses) in Srirangam. In total there are 247 hymns of the 4000 Pasurams dedicated to Ranganthar deity of this temple. Except Madhurakavi Alvar,  all the other eleven Alvars have created Mangalasasanam (praise) about the Ranganathar in Srirangam. Out of 247, 35 are by Periyalvar, 10 by Andal, 31 by Kulasekara Alvar, 14 by Thirumalisai Alvar, 55 by Thondaradippodi Alvar, 10 by Thiruppaan Alvar, 73 by Thirumangai Alvar, one by Poigai Alvar,4 by Bhoothathalvar, two by Peyalvar and twelve by Nammalvar. Kulasekarar (Cheraman II) gave up his kingdom to his son during 798 CE and started visiting temples and singing praises about them. He visited the temple, praised the presiding deity and his works are compiled in the Naalayira Divya Prabandam.

Kambar is a 12th-century Tamil poet who composed the Kamba Ramayanam, a work inspired from the epic, Valmiki Ramayana. He is believed to have come to the temple to get the approval of his work from scholars. The Jain scholar Tirunarungundam honoured the work and it resulted in Tamil and Sanskrit scholars approving the work.  The open hall where he recited his verse lies close to the Ranganayaki shrine within the temple.

Some of the religious works like Sri Bhashyam by Ramanuja, Gadya Traya (which is a compilation of three texts called the Saranagati Gadyam, Sriranga Gadyam and the Vaikunta Gadyam) by Ramanuja, Sri Renga natha shtakam by Adi Shankaracharya, Renga raja Stavam and Guna ratna kosham by Sri Parasar bhattar, Renga raja Sthothram by Kurathazhwar, are some of the works that were exclusively composed in praise of  the presiding deities Lord Ranganatha and Goddess Ranganayaki of Srirangam temple.

Pilgrimage 
Koil or koyil in Tamil means the house of the Master and thus refers to the temples. Srirangam is the most prominent among such temples. For many Vaishnavas the term Koyil exclusively refers to this temple, indicating its extreme importance for them (for saivas and all other Tamil people the term koyil refers to Thillai Natarajar Golden Shrine (Chidambaram Temple)). The presiding deity Ranganathar is praised in many names by his devotees, including Nam Perumal (our god in Tamil), Azhagiya Manavaalan (beautiful groom in Tamil). The deity is also known as Kasturi Ranga and Alagiya Manavalan.

The temple is considered in the Alwar traditions as one of the eight Sywayambu Kshetras of Vishnu where presiding deity is believed to have manifested on its own. Seven other temples in the line are Bhu Varaha Swamy temple, Tirumala Venkateswara Temple, and Vanamamalai Perumal Temple in South India and Saligrama, Naimisaranya, Pushkar and Badrinath Temple in North India.

Vaishnava scholarship 
Many of the medieval Sri Vaishanava scholars like Nathamuni, Ramanuja, Pillai Lokacharya, Vedanta Desika and Manavala Mamunigal are associated with the temple. Ramanuja was a theologian, philosopher, and scriptural exegete. Ramanuja renounced his family life and went to Srirangam to occupy the pontificate – Srirangam became the stronghold of him and his disciples.

The doctrine of Vishishtadvaita philosophy, Sri Bhashyam was written and later compiled by Ramanuja over a period of time in this temple town. During his stay in Srirangam, he is said of have written "Gadhya Thrayam", which is recited in the temple during the ninth day (Panguni Uttaram) of the festival of Adi brahmotsavam. The temple is a center for the Vishishtadvaita school where Sanskrit Vedas and Tamil works are preached and taught with great reverence. He attained divinity in Srirangam. The disciples of Ramanuja got his permission to install three metallic images, one each at Sriperumpudur, Melukote and the third, at Srirangam. 

He is found seated in the Padmasana (yogic sitting posture), depicting the Gnyana-Mudrai (symbol of knowledge) with his right palm. "Kovil Ozhugu" is a codification of all temple practices, religious and administrative, shaped and institutionalised by Sri Ramanuja after receiving the due rights from Sri Thiruvarangathamudanar. A stone inscription to this effect is installed in the Arya patal vasal (main gate before the first precinct).

Pancharanga Kshetrams (also called Pancharangams, meaning the "five Rangams or Ranganathas") is a group of five sacred Hindu temples, dedicated to Ranganatha, a form of the god Vishnu, on the banks of the Kaveri River. The five Pancharanga Kshetrams in the order of their successive locations, on the banks of the Kaveri River are: The Srirangapatnam called the Adi Ranga, the first temple on the banks of the Kaveri River from the upstream side; the Sri Ranganathaswamy Temple at Srirangam known as Adya Ranga (the last temple), Appalarangam or Koviladi at Tiruppernagar in Tamil Nadu, Parimala Ranganatha Perumal Temple or Mayuram at Indalur, Mayiladuthurai and Vatarangam at Sirkazhi. The Sarangapani temple at Kumbakonam is mentioned in place of Vatarangam in some references.

Administration
The temple is maintained and administered by the Hindu Religious and Charitable Endowments Department of the Government of Tamil Nadu. An Executive officer appointed by the Board manages the temple along with Sri Azhagiya Manavala Perumal Temple, Pundarikakshan Perumal Temple at Thiruvellarai, Sri Vadivazhagiya Nambi Perumal Temple and Mariamman Temple at Anbil. There are three trustees and a chairman for the board of trustees. Annadhanam scheme, which provides free food to devotees, is implemented in the temple by the Board. Under the scheme, free food is offered to two hundred devotees every day in the temple and the expenditure is fully funded by the contributions from devotees.

Festivals and routine visits 

The temple celebrates numerous festivals around the year including processions. These are called utsavam (celebrations).

Vaikunta Ekadashi 

Pagal Pathu (10 day time) and Ra Pathu (10  night time) festival is celebrated in the month of Margazhi (December–January) for twenty days. The first ten days are referred as Pagal-Pathu (10-day time festival) and the second half as Ra Pathu (10 day night-time festival). The first day of Ra pathu is Vaikunta Ekadashi. The eleventh day of each fortnight in Hindu calendar is called ekadasi and the holiest of all ekadasis as per Vaishnavite tradition is the Vaikuntha Ekadashi. During the festival, through song and dance, this place is affirmed to be Bhuloka Vaikuntam (Heaven on Earth).  Araiyar Sevai is a divine colloquium of araiyars, who recite and enact Nalayara Divya Prabanda, the 4000 verses of  Alvars. Araiyars are born to Araiyar tradition most prevalent in Sri Vaishnava families in Srirangam, Alwar Thirunagari and Srivilliputhur.  The tradition of Araiyar Sevai was started by Nathamuni during 10th century. It is believed as per Hindu mythology that 33 crores of gods come down to witness the event. The processional deity is brought to the 1000-pillared hall on the morning of Vaikunta Ekadashi through the Paramapada Vasal (gate to paradise). Lakhs of pilgrims rush to enter it after the gate is opened and the deity passes through it as it is believed that one who enters here will reach Vaikuntham (the abode of Vishnu) after death. The gate is open only during the ten days of Ra Pathu (10-day night-time festival). On the last day of the festival, the poet Nammalvar is said to be given salvation. The performance is enacted by priests and images in the temple depicts Nammalvar as reaching heaven and getting liberation from the cycle of life and death. At that point, a member from the crowd of devotees, who are witnessing this passion play, goes up to the centre stage and requests Vishnu to return Nammalvar to humanity, so that his words and form in the temple will continue to inspire and save the devotees. Following this performance of the salvation of Nammalvar, the cantors are taken in procession round the temple.

Jyestabisheka 
The annual gold ornament cleaning festival is called Jyestabisheka (first of anointing) and is celebrated during the Tamil month of aani (June–July). The icons of all deities are abluted with water brought in large vessels of gold and silver.

Brahmotsavam 
Brahmotsavam (Prime festival) is held during the Tamil month of Panguni (March–April). The preliminaries like ankurarpanam, rakshabandhanam, bheri thadanam, dhwajarohanam and the sacrificial offerings in the yagasala are gone through as usual. The processions go round the Chitrai street in the evenings. On the second day, the deity is taken to a garden inside the temple. The deity is taken in a palanquin through the river Kaveri to a village on the opposite shore namely Jiyarpuram on the third day.

Other Festivals 
The annual temple chariot festival, called Rathothsavam is celebrated during the Tamil month of thai (January–February) and the processional deity, utsavar is taken round the temple in the temple car. Chitra Poornima is a festival based on the mythological incident of Gajendra Moksha (elephant crocodile). The elephant suffered in the jaws of crocodile and god rescued the elephant. Vasanthothsavam is celebrated during the Tamil month of vaikasi (May–June) which according to inscriptions is celebrated from 1444 CE.

See also
Chidambaram Nataraja Temple
Group of Monuments at Mahabalipuram
Great Living Chola Temples
Meenakshi Temple, Madurai
Rangapura Vihara

Notes

References

Bibliography

External links 

 

Hindu temples in Tiruchirappalli
Divya Desams
Vaishnavism
Vishnu temples
UNESCO Asia-Pacific Heritage Awards winners
Pandyan architecture
World Heritage Tentative List for India